Shikshaa is a 1979 Bollywood film directed by S. Ramanathan, starring Raj Kiran and Sushma Verma. The film was a remake of Telugu film Neramu Siksha.

Cast
 Raj Kiran - Vijay D. Gupta
 Sushma Verma - Madhu
 Beena Banerjee - Janaki
 Iftekhar - Rai Bahadur Dwarka Das Gupta
 Urmila Bhatt - Laxmi D. Gupta

Soundtrack
The music was composed by Bappi Lahiri for lyrics by Gauhar Kanpuri.
 "Teri Choti Si Ek Bhool" - K. J. Yesudas
 "Main Diwani" - Aarthi Mukherjee
 "Yari Hai Phoolon Se Meri" 1 - Bappi Lahiri
 "Chhan Chhan Baj Rahe Ghunghroo" - Shailendra Singh, Anuradha Paudwal
 "Jehi Vidhi Rakhe Ram" - Chandrani Mukherjee 
 "Yari Hai Phoolon Se Meri" 2 - Bappi Lahiri

External links
 

1979 films
1970s Hindi-language films
Rajshri Productions films
Films directed by S. Ramanathan
Films scored by Bappi Lahiri
Hindi remakes of Telugu films